Nihat is a Turkish given name for males. It means "legacy".  People named Nihat include:

 Ali Nihat Yazıcı (born 1964), Turkish chess official
 Nihat Anılmış (1876–1954), Ottoman army officer and Turkish general 
 Nihat Balkan, Turkish fencer
 Nihat Baştürk (born 1973), Turkish footballer
 Nihat Bekdik (1902–1972), Turkish footballer
 Nihat Berker (born 1949), Turkish theoretical physicist
 Nihat Ergün (born 1962), Turkish politician and government minister
 Nihat Erim (1912–1980), Turkish politician and journalist
 Nihat Eski (born 1963), Turkish-Dutch politician
 Nihat Genç (born 1956), Turkish journalist and writer
 Nihat Kahveci (born 1979), Turkish footballer
 Nihat Nikerel (1950–2009), Turkish actor
 Nihat Özdemir (born 1950), Turkish businessman
 Nihat Şahin (born 1989), Turkish footballer
 Nihat Türkmenoğlu (born 1988), Turkish opara archer
 Nihat Zeybekci (born 1961), Turkish economist, politician and government minister

See also
 Nihad

Turkish masculine given names